Crack Attic is a compilation of songs from the first five studio albums by Crack the Sky. It draws most heavily from their 1975 debut and 1976 follow-up, with more than half of the tracks here taken from those two releases.

Track listing

Personnel

The band
Joe Macre — Bass guitar, back-up vocals
Rick Witkowski — Guitar, back-up vocals
John Palumbo — Bass guitar, vocals, keyboards, guitar, piano
Gary Lee Chappell — Lead vocals ("Nuclear Apathy", "Lighten Up McGraw")
Joey D'Amico — Drums, back-up vocals, lead vocals ("Long Nights")
Vince DePaul — Synthesizer, keyboards
Jim Griffiths — guitar, back-up vocals

Additional musicians
Terence P. Minogue — Horn
Michael Brecker — Horn ("She's a Dancer", "Mind Baby")
Randy Brecker — Horn ("She's a Dancer", "Mind Baby")
David Sanborn — Horn ("She's a Dancer", "Mind Baby")

1994 compilation albums
Crack the Sky albums